Todd James Eldredge (born August 28, 1971) is an American former competitive figure skater. He is the 1996 World champion, a six-time U.S. national champion (1990, 1991, 1995, 1997, 1998, 2002), a three-time Olympian (1992, 1998, 2002), and a six-time World medalist.

Career 
Eldredge began skating when he was five years old and moved from Chatham, Massachusetts, to Philadelphia at age ten to train with Richard Callaghan. He later trained at the Detroit Skating Club in Bloomfield Hills, Michigan and at the Onyx in Rochester Hills, Michigan. He won silver at the 1987 World Junior Championships and then gold in 1988. He took bronze at the 1988 Skate America.

In the 1989–90 season, Eldredge won his first senior national title and was sent to the 1990 World Championships, where he finished fifth. The following season, he repeated as the national champion and then took the bronze medal at the 1991 World Championships. Although Eldredge missed the 1992 U.S. Championships, he was nominated to represent the U.S. at the 1992 Winter Olympics. He placed tenth in Albertville and then seventh at the 1992 World Championships.

Eldredge struggled during the next two seasons, coming sixth at the 1993 U.S. Championships and fourth in 1994, and was not selected for the 1994 Olympics. He regained momentum in the 1994–95 season, taking silver at the 1994 Goodwill Games and gold at the 1994 Skate America and 1994 NHK Trophy. He then won his third national title and silver at the 1995 World Championships. In 1996, he came away with silver at the U.S. Championships but won gold at the 1996 World Championships.

In the 1996-1997 season Eldredge started off on fire, easily beating Alexei Urmanov (who also skated cleanly) to win Skate America.  He controversially lost the Grand Prix final to Elvis Stojko who landed the first ever quadruple-triple combination, but had other errors, including a fall on his 2nd triple axel.  Eldredge skated a clean and more complete program, but suffered from the home country scoring of the event in Canada.   He regained his U.S title easily, in the absence of defending Champion Rudy Galindo, who was now professional.  At the World Championships Eldredge skated a spectacular short program, but due to the very early draw he finished 2nd to Alexei Urmanov who skated near the very end.  The top 6 were all clean with triple axel-triple toe combinations.  Elvis Stojko though came from 4th to win the gold after a flawless long program with a quadruple-triple combination.  Eldredge first singled, then later fell on his 2nd triple axel try, sealing his fate when combined with that he also didn't have a quadruple jump to begin with.

In the pivotal year of his career in 1997-1998, Eldredge suffered through a sluggish grand prix circuit.  First winning Skate America with an uninspiring skate, after injuring himself in warm up.  Then placing only 4th at Trophee Lalique, won by rising start Alexei Yagudin.  He controversially finished 3rd at the Grand Prix final where most believed he deserved at least 2nd place above Elvis Stojko.  He skated cleanly, apart from a doubled triple loop, and strangely lost to Stojko who fell on his quadruple attempt.  He then finished fourth at his second Olympics, in Nagano, after a crushing long program performance, managing only 5 of 8 planned triples, when a clean skate would have garnered him at least silver comfortably.  He rebounded to win silver at a watered down World Championships in his home country, an event missing all 3 Olympic medalists.  A fall in the short program cost him the gold to rising star Alexei Yagudin, despite comfortably winning the long program with a strong skate.

Eldredge continued to compete in pro ams and leave the door open for a return to amateur figure skating. In 2000, he landed his first quadruple jump in competition at the Masters of Figure Skating.  He competed in various events through the 1999-2000 season, yet oddly did not skate at the World Championships.   Eldredge withdrew from the 2001 Four Continents Championships due to an ankle injury.  He returned to the U.S Championships for the first time since 1998, and took silver behind Tim Goebel, but then edged Goebel for the bronze at the World Championships where most felt he deserved silver over an injured and flawed Alexei Yagudin.  In 2002, he won his sixth U.S. title and placed sixth in his third Olympic appearance.  After retiring from competition, he toured with Stars on Ice.

Eldredge was inducted into the U.S. Figure Skating Hall of Fame during the 2008 U.S. Figure Skating Championships. On January 31, 2011, the World Figure Skating Hall of Fame announced Eldredge as a nominee for an outstanding competitor in the men's category.

Eldredge formerly coached at the Germain Arena in Estero, Florida. In April 2012, he underwent left hip replacement surgery. Beginning in 2014, he coached at the Dr Pepper StarCenter in Frisco, Texas. 

In 2018, Eldredge relocated to Irvine, California, and he now coaches at Great Park Ice. His students include Emmi Peltonen and Yaroslav Paniot.

Personal life 
Eldredge was born in Chatham, Massachusetts.  He married Megan McCrea on September 3, 2005, in St. Petersburg, Florida. In 2008, he moved to Florida. In March 2009, Todd said he was divorced.  Eldredge married Sabrina Corbaci on September 28, 2012, in San Diego, California. Corbaci is a graphic designer and two-time (1991, 1992) U.S. novice pairs medalist with Eddy Zeidler. They have two sons — Ayrton, born May 26, 2012, and Ryder, born in 2004.

Programs

Competitive highlights
GP: Champions Series / Grand Prix

Post-1993

Pre-1993

References

External links

Todd Eldredge's Official website
Todd Eldredge's Coaching Bio
Todd Eldredge on Instagram
 
Stars on Ice: Todd Eldredge
Todd Eldredge's U.S. Olympic Team bio

1971 births
Living people
American male single skaters
Figure skaters at the 1992 Winter Olympics
Figure skaters at the 1998 Winter Olympics
Figure skaters at the 2002 Winter Olympics
Olympic figure skaters of the United States
People from Chatham, Massachusetts
Sportspeople from Barnstable County, Massachusetts
World Figure Skating Championships medalists
World Junior Figure Skating Championships medalists
Goodwill Games medalists in figure skating
Competitors at the 1990 Goodwill Games
Competitors at the 1994 Goodwill Games